The 1960–61 Hong Kong First Division League season was the 50th since its establishment.

League table

References
1960–61 Hong Kong First Division table (RSSSF)

Hong Kong First Division League seasons
Hong
football